In complex analysis, the Siu semicontinuity theorem implies that the Lelong number of a closed positive current on a complex manifold is semicontinuous. More precisely, the points where the Lelong number is at least some constant form a complex subvariety.

References

Complex manifolds
Theorems in complex analysis